The Impérieuse was a 40-gun  of the French Navy. The Royal Navy captured her in 1793 and she served first as HMS Imperieuse and then from 1803 as HMS Unite. She became a hospital hulk in 1836 and was broken up in 1858.

French service and capture
In 1788, Impérieuse cruised in the Middle East, and the Aegean Sea the two following years. She performed another cruise off the Middle East before returning to Toulon.

British service

The Royal Navy commissioned Imperieuse as the fifth-rate frigate HMS Imperieuse.

French Revolutionary Wars: HMS Imperieuse

Imperieuse entered service in 1795, and operated in the West Indies off Martinique and Surinam for most of the French Revolutionary Wars, under the command of Captain John Beresford. Imperieuse returned to Britain at the Peace of Amiens.

Napoleonic Wars: HMS Unite

When the Napoleonic Wars began Imperieuse was renamed Unite and returned to service in the Mediterranean. The frigate was under the command of Captain Chaloner Ogle as one of Nelson's scouts, but not present at Trafalgar; instead, she lay dismasted in Lisbon harbour.

Unité,  and  shared in the capture of the Buona Esperanza on 19 July 1807 and the Bizzaro, on 21 August. The bankruptcy of the prize agents meant that some prize money was not distributed until 21 years later, in 1828. The fourth and final payment for Bizzarro did not occur until July 1850.

Campbell reported no casualties in the capture of Ronco. Teulié lost five men killed and 16 wounded before she struck; Nettuno lost seven killed, two drowned, and 13 wounded. The Royal Navy took all three into service, Ronco under the name HMS Tuscan, Teulié under the name HMS Roman, and Nettuno under the name HMS Cretan.

On 19 May 1810 Unite captured the French privateer Du Guay Trouin of 10 guns and 116 men.

By 1811 Unite was still operating in the Mediterranean, under Captain Chamberlayne.

Ajax captured Dromadaire, while the frigates managed to escape to Portoferraio. Captain Otway of Ajax reported that Dromadaire was frigate-built and sailed remarkably well. Her cargo consisted of 15,000 shot and shells of various sizes and 90 tons of gunpowder. Apparently Napoleon Bonaparte intended them as a present for Hammuda ibn Ali, the Bey of Tunis. Admiral Sir Charles Cotton, commander in chief of the British Mediterranean Fleet, decided to buy her and her stores for the Royal Navy.

Through the summer Unite operated off the mouth of the Tiber and in the autumn she was once again sent to the Adriatic, participating in the action of 29 November 1811 at which she captured the armed storeship .

On 16 June 1812 boats from Unite,  and  captured three vessels of from eighty to one hundred tons in the small port of Badisea, near Otranto.

On 9 November 1812 Unite was in sight when  captured Nebrophonus.

Post-war and fate

By 1815, Unite was back in Britain in reserve at Deptford and she remained there until converted for harbour service in 1832. Between 1841 and 1858, she was used as a prison hulk. The ship was eventually broken up in January 1858 at Chatham Dockyard.

Notes

Citations

References
 
 
 Ships of the Old Navy

External links 
 

Frigates of the Royal Navy
1787 ships
Maritime incidents in 1793
Captured ships